Joris Sainati (born 25 September 1988) is a French professional footballer who plays as a defender for Ligue 2 club Bastia.

Career
Sainati was given a 16-month ban after he punched two players of Tours on 28 August 2015 in what was a 2–1 defeat for Ajaccio. This sanction, however, was later reduced to 10 months, thereby making Sainati eligible to play for the 2016–17 Ligue 2 season.

In 2021, Sainati signed for Ligue 2 club Bastia.

References

External links
 

1988 births
Living people
French people of Italian descent
People from Martigues
Sportspeople from Bouches-du-Rhône
French footballers
Association football defenders
AC Ajaccio players
Ergotelis F.C. players
FC Istres players
FC Lorient players
Pau FC players
US Orléans players
SC Bastia players
Ligue 2 players
Championnat National players
Championnat National 3 players
Super League Greece players
Footballers from Provence-Alpes-Côte d'Azur